Türker Armaner (born April 7, 1968 in Istanbul) is an Istanbul-based writer, philosopher, and translator. He studied at the universities of Hacettepe, Boğaziçi, and Bergen and took his PhD degree in 2002 at  Paris 8 University (Saint Denis) His first story was published on Hayalet Gemi (Phantom Ship) in 1995. His first book, Kıyısız (Shoreless), was published in 1997, his second book, Taş Hücre (Stone Cell), in 2000, his third book, Dalgakıran (Breakwater), in 2003, his novel, Tahta Saplı Bıçak (Wooden Hilted Knife) in 2007 and his last book, a philosophical inquiry, Tarih ve Temsil (History and Representation) in 2014. He is currently teaching at the Department of Philosophy at Galatasaray University, Istanbul, as an associate professor. He also is an editor at various publications in Istanbul, in addition to having many articles published in several journals.

References

External links

Metis Publications 

1968 births
21st-century philosophers
Academic staff of Galatasaray University
Living people
Turkish philosophers
Turkish translators
21st-century translators